The Bushranger may refer to:

 The Bushranger (1928 film)
 The Bushranger (1976 film)
 The Bushrangers, a play staged in Australia

See also 
 Bushranger (disambiguation)